Growing Your Business Can be as Fun & Easy as... Giving Candy to Strangers, Tips for Creating Abundance through Heart-Centered Sales is a self-help book about running businesses. The book was written by creative director Stan Holden, who has been featured on the PBS TV show, The American Health Journal.

Giving Candy to Strangers contains information about creating relationships on social media, how emotions play into the process of sales, mixing business with pleasure and creating connections without an agenda. The foreword was written by Kevin Sorbo.

When Holden started writing Giving Candy To Strangers he decided to design the cover himself because of his experience as a graphic artist.

External links 
 Official site

References 

2015 non-fiction books
Self-help books
Works about business